Rockwool A/S (or AS), also known as the ROCKWOOL Group, is a Danish multinational manufacturer of mineral wool products headquartered in Hedehusene, Greater Copenhagen, Denmark. The company's R&D unit, employing 100 people as of 2016, is co-located with the headquarters in Copenhagen.

Rockwool was the world's largest maker of insulation materials in 2009, but had fallen to the second largest by 2016. , 90% of the company's revenue came from the sale of insulation products, while 80% came from sales in Europe.

History
Rockwool was founded as Korsør Stenforretning by constructor Henrik Johan Henriksen and brickyard-owner Valdemar Kähler in 1909 as a gravel mining company. In 1922, the company won the contract on improving the dykes at Saltbæk Vig and later purchased the area.

In 1927, it purchased a chipping plant at Hedehusene. In 1937, a production of mineral wool (stone wool) was established at the site based on an American license acquired by Finn Henriksen during a visit to the States. By 1939, the focus of the company had fully turned toward the manufacture of insulation.

In 1972, the company was divided into H+H and I/S Kähler & Co. Kähler & Co. was led by Valdemar Kähler's grand son Claus Kähler. He was succeeded on the post by his son Tom Kähler in 1986. In 2004, Tom became chairman of the board while Eelco van Heel took over the position as chief executive officer.

The company began trading as "Rockwool International A/S" on the Copenhagen Stock Exchange in 1995. Before it became a public company, it was a family-owned business, held by the Kähler family.

The company's first plant in the United States opened in 2014 in Marshall County, Mississippi.  In 2017, the company announced a North American expansion through establishment of a plant in Ranson, West Virginia through its subsidiary Roxul.

Brands

Rockfon
Rockfon is a brand of acoustic ceiling and wall solutions based on rockwool.

Flumroc 
In 1969, Rockwool acquired a minority stake related to technology licensing in the privately held Swiss company Flumroc AG. In November 2017 Rockwool completed acquisition of all outstanding shares of Flumroc; company sales have been largely limited to Switzerland. Due to the broad recognition of the brand in Switzerland, Rockwool kept using the Flumroc brand.

Roxul 
With the acquisition of a stone wool factory in Ontario, Canada, Roxul Inc. was established as the Canadian subsidiary. When business started in the United States, Roxul USA Inc. was established as the US subsidiary. On 1 January 2018, the North American insulation business rebranded to ROCKWOOL North America.

Management
From 1987-2004, Rockwool Group's President and CEO was Tom Kähler. From 2004-2014, Eelco van Heel held those positions. As of 2015, Rockwool Group's President and CEO was Jens Birgersson.

Locations
Rockwool International is represented in 38 countries (2016), operating 28 factories in the following countries:
 Canada (Milton, Ontario since 1988 and Grand Forks, British Columbia since 1999)
 Czech Republic (Bohumin since 1998)
 China (Guangzhou since 2010)
 Croatia (Istria since 2007)
 Denmark (Doense near Hobro near since 1977 and Vamdrup since 1966)
 France (Saint-Éloy-les-Mines since 1980)
 India (Dahej since 2011)
 Germany (Gladbeck since 1954, Neuburg an der Donau since 1974 and Flechtingen since 1991)
 Hungary (Tapolca since 2003)
 Malaysia (Melaka since 2000 and Bukit Raja near Klang since 2010) 
 Netherlands (Roermond since 1971)
 Norway (Trondheim since 1950 and Moss since 1965)
 Poland (Cigacice since 1993 and Małkinia since 1995)
 Romania (Aricestii-Rahtivani - since 2019)
 Russia (Zheleznodorozhny since 1999, Vyborg since 2006, Troitsk since 2010, and Elabuga since 2012)
 Spain (Caparroso since 2000)
 Sweden (Eskilstuna - under construction)
 Switzerland (Flums fully owned since 2017)
 United Kingdom (Wern Tarw in Wales since 1979)
 Thailand (Rayong since 2010)
 United States (Byhalia,)

Intellectual property 
In 2008, there were a number of actions by the World Intellectual Property Organisation in regard to internet domain names which have resulted in domain transfer to Rockwool, among these being "china-ocean-rockwool.com", "rockwoolfactory.com", and "rockwoolvietnam.com". In 2015, Rockwool International filed suit against Rock Wool Manufacturing Company hoping to quash potential consumer confusion in the face of the defendant having filed a trademark application for "Rock Wool"; the suit was dismissed by the court after Rock Wool's abandonment of their trademark application.

Rockwool Foundation 
In 1981, six members of the Kähler family established the Rockwool Foundation with an endowment of 25% of each of their own stock holdings in Rockwool International.  The Foundation has been referred to as a think tank by some authors. The Rockwool Foundation Research Unit was established as a fully independent unit with a focus on social science research in 1987 by the Foundation, led since 2003 by Torbin Tranæs. The Research Unit has been described as self-financed and non-partisan.  The Research Unit has published on topics such as the extent of the financial black market in Denmark. In other published cases, it has been unclear whether the Research Unit or the Foundation have been the actor, as in the case of examining the British health care system with an eye toward the financial cost of emulating the Kaiser Permanente system, and an analysis of the impact on the Danish economy of wages lost through prisoner incarceration.

Notes

References

Further reading 
 Chief competitors appear in section "Subdivisions of Global Insulating Fiber Market" of the web page:

External links

 Official website

Manufacturing companies of Denmark
Companies based in Høje-Taastrup Municipality
Danish companies established in 1909
Manufacturing companies established in 1909
Multinational companies headquartered in Denmark
Danish brands